The Growing Paynes is an American sitcom that aired on the DuMont Television Network.

Broadcast history
The series aired on DuMont on Wednesdays at 8:30 pm ET for one season, 1948 to 1949. The series stars John Harvey, Judy Parrish, David Anderson, Ann Sullivan, Lester Lonergan, Jr., and Warren Parker.

One of the first sitcoms to air in the United States, the 30-minute series was broadcast live. Advertisements for the show's sponsor, Wanamaker's Department Store, were worked into the early stories.

Harvey and Parrish, who were husband and wife in real life, left the show in 1949 and were replaced by Edward Holmes and Elaine Stritch as Mr. and Mrs. Payne. This series marked Stritch's television debut.

Synopsis
The setting is the Payne family's apartment. Comedic situations deal with the trials of an insurance salesman, George Payne (played by Harvey), his screwball wife, Laraine Payne (played by Parrish), and their young son, John Payne (played by Anderson). Often it is their maid, Birdie (played by Sullivan), who saves the day.

Episode status
One episode of The Growing Paynes is at the UCLA Film and Television Archive and four episodes are at the Paley Center for Media.

Cast
John Harvey as George Payne (1948-1949)
Judy Parrish as Laraine Payne (1948-1949)
David Anderson as John Payne
Ann Sullivan as Birdie
Lester Lonergan, Jr.
Warren Parker

Replacement cast
Edward Holmes as George Payne (1949)
Elaine Stritch as Laraine Payne (1949)

See also
List of programs broadcast by the DuMont Television Network
List of surviving DuMont Television Network broadcasts
1948-49 United States network television schedule
Mary Kay and Johnny (The first sitcom to air in the United States)

References

Bibliography
David Weinstein, The Forgotten Network: DuMont and the Birth of American Television (Philadelphia: Temple University Press, 2004) 
Alex McNeil, Total Television, Fourth edition (New York: Penguin Books, 1980) 
Tim Brooks and Earle Marsh, The Complete Directory to Prime Time Network TV Shows, Third edition (New York: Ballantine Books, 1964)

External links
The Growing Paynes at IMDB
The Growing Paynes at CTVA
DuMont Historical Website

1940s American sitcoms
1948 American television series debuts
1949 American television series endings
DuMont Television Network original programming
Black-and-white American television shows
American live television series
English-language television shows